Bamboo Gods and Iron Men is a martial arts comedy film set in the Philippines. It is considered a blaxploitation film. It was produced by American International Pictures.

It stars the Filipino actors, Chiquito, Vic Diaz, and Eddie Garcia.

Plot
James Iglehart plays African-American prize fighter Cal Jefferson who is on honeymoon in Hong Kong with his new wife played by Shirley Washington. He comes across a drowning Chinese man who he jumps in the sea to save. This now revived and very grateful mute man turns out to be someone they cannot be rid of. They finally are rid of him or so it seems. They purchase an item in Hong Kong which becomes the center of a gang's attention. The gang led by Kenneth Metcalfe will stop at nothing to retrieve it. They leave Hong Kong for Manila in the Philippines and find themselves being attacked with the mute Chinese man coming to their assistance.

Cast
James Iglehart as Cal Jefferson
Shirley Washington as Arlene Jefferson
Chiquito as Charley
Eddie Garcia as Ambrose
Ken Metcalfe as Leonardo King
Marissa Delgado as Pandora
Vic Diaz as Hotel clerk
Joe Zucchero as Ivan Soroka
Michael Boyet as Gunman
Steve Alcarado
Subas Herrero
Leo Martinez
Benny Pestano
Boy Picate
Robert Picate
Robert Rivera
Tony Uy
Bonnie Kay Eddie
Source:

See also
 List of American films of 1974

References

External links

 

1974 films
Blaxploitation films
American International Pictures films
Films shot in the Philippines
1970s martial arts comedy films
American martial arts comedy films
1970s English-language films
1970s American films